Zorin OS is a Linux distribution based on Ubuntu. It uses a GNOME 3 and XFCE 4 desktop environment by default, although the desktop is heavily customized in order to help users transition from Windows and macOS easily.  Wine and PlayOnLinux are supported, allowing users to run compatible Windows software, like Microsoft Office. Its creators maintain three free editions of the operating system, and sell a professional edition.

Features
Zorin OS is fully graphical, with a graphical installer. For stability and security, it follows the long-term releases of the main Ubuntu system. It uses its own software repositories as well as Ubuntu's repositories. These repositories are accessible through the common apt-get or  apt install commands via the Linux terminal, or a GUI-based software manager that provides an app store-like experience for users who don't wish to use the terminal.

The OS also comes with a number of desktop layouts or themes to modify the desktop environment. The themes let users change the interface to resemble those of Microsoft Windows, macOS, or Ubuntu and allow the interface to be familiar regardless of the previous system a user has come from. As with all GNOME-based desktop environments, the look and feel of the desktop can be modified using GNOME extensions.

Editions 
Zorin OS is available in various editions:

 Pro (Paid)
 Pro Lite (Paid)
 Core (free)
 Lite (free)
 Education (without support) (free)
 Education Lite (without support) (free)

The Lite editions are streamlined to work on older computers and use XFCE instead of GNOME.

The Pro edition is available for download with a purchase through the project's website. It offers additional layout themes for different operating systems, including both Windows 11 and "Windows Classic" (Windows 7) themes, a collection of wallpapers to choose from, and comes preinstalled with popular FOSS programs such as Blender, in-house software for managing passwords, and software for casting content to Miracast-compatible screens. The Pro edition provides installation technical support as well.

Zorin OS Pro can be installed on multiple computers with one license, except for businesses and schools that must purchase a license for each PC the OS is installed onto.

History
The project was started in 2008 by co-founders Artyom and Kyrill Zorin. The company is based in Dublin, Ireland.

Zorin OS was initially released on 1 July 2009. Since version 12.4, the system's update manager can be used to upgrade existing installations; earlier versions required users to do a clean install

Versions

Special functions

Zorin Connect
With Zorin Connect, an Android phone can be synchronized with the PC. Pictures and files as well as the clipboard are transferred in both directions. Notifications from the cell phone can be displayed on the PC. The cell phone can also be used as a remote keyboard, mouse (touchpad) and presenter.

The exchange happens directly over an encrypted Internet connection, so there is no need to store data in a cloud.

Zorin Grid
Zorin Grid is software for installing and maintaining Zorin OS within a network. This is done from a central computer, so that the processes do not have to be performed individually on each device. The software is especially aimed at companies and schools. At the moment, however, it is still under development.

Security
Zorin OS comes with the Uncomplicated Firewall installed, although it is not enabled by default.

Zorin Grid has options to improve security.

Reception
Zorin OS has been praised for its intuitive and familiar layouts, functionality, and installation process; as well as for making it easy to use a Windows-similar layout, install NVIDIA drivers, and navigate the software store.

Notes and references

External links
 
 
 Zorin OS on OpenSourceFeed Gallery

Irish brands
Linux distributions
Ubuntu derivatives
X86-64 Linux distributions